Three sharps may refer to:
A major, a major musical key with three sharps
F-sharp minor, a minor musical key with three sharps